The Tanza–Trece Martires Road (or Tanza–Trece Martires Highway) is a , two-to-four lane, primary highway in Cavite, Philippines. It connects the municipality of Tanza to the city of Trece Martires.

The entire road is designated as a component of National Route 64 (N64) of the Philippine highway network.

Intersections

References

External links 
 Department of Public Works and Highways

Roads in Cavite